The following lists events that happened during 1804 in Chile.

Incumbent
Royal Governor of Chile: Luis Muñoz de Guzmán

Events

Births
March 20 - Manuel Camilo Vial, politician (d. 1882)

November 2 - Rafael Valentín Valdivieso, Catholic priest (d. 1878)

Deaths

References

 
Years of the 19th century in Chile
Years in the Captaincy General of Chile
1800s in the Captaincy General of Chile
Chile
Chile